The 1961 Stanley Cup Finals was the championship series of the National Hockey League's (NHL) 1960–61 season, and the culmination of the 1961 Stanley Cup playoffs. It was contested between the Detroit Red Wings and the Chicago Black Hawks. Chicago was making its first Finals appearance since , and Detroit its first appearance since ; both had lost to the Montreal Canadiens in those previous appearances. The Black Hawks won the best-of-seven series, four games to two, to win their third Stanley Cup, their first since . However, this proved to be the last time Chicago won the Cup until , a 49-year drought.

Paths to the Finals
Detroit defeated Toronto in five games and Chicago upset Montreal, the record five-time defending champion, in six, setting up the first all-American-team Finals since , when the Wings beat the New York Rangers in a seven-game series.

Game summaries
Two future Hockey Hall of Fame members, Bobby Hull and Stan Mikita, made their first Stanley Cup appearances. Hull scored two goals in the first game, including the winner, and Mikita scored the winner in game five.

This was the only Stanley Cup championship in the 1960s not to be won by either the Toronto Maple Leafs or the Montreal Canadiens or feature either team.

Stanley Cup engraving
The 1961 Stanley Cup was presented to Black Hawks captain Ed Litzenberger by NHL President Clarence Campbell following the Black Hawks 5–1 win over the Red Wings in game six.

The following Black Hawks players and staff had their names engraved on the Stanley Cup

1960–61 Chicago Black Hawks

Broadcasting
The 1961 Stanley Cup Finals were almost not televised in Canada at all. At that time, the CBC only had rights to the Montreal Canadiens and Toronto Maple Leafs' games; home games only during the season and all games in the playoffs. However, with both the Canadiens and Maple Leafs eliminated in the semi-finals, the CBC's worst nightmare became reality. The CBC had to conceive a way to carry the Finals between the Chicago Black Hawks and Detroit Red Wings or face public revolt. According to lore, the CBC found a way to link their Windsor viewers as having a vested interest in the Finals with the across the river Red Wings. Thus, CBC was able to carry the series after inking special contracts with the Red Wings and Black Hawks as a service to the Windsor market. From Windsor, CBC linked the signal to Toronto and they relayed the coverage Dominion-wide. From there, Canadians were able to see the Finals with nary a glitch in the coverage.

See also
 1960–61 NHL season

Notes

References

 Podnieks, Andrew; Hockey Hall of Fame (2004). Lord Stanley's Cup. Bolton, Ont.: Fenn Pub. pp 12, 50. 

Stanley Cup
Stanley Cup Finals
1960
Detroit Red Wings games
April 1961 sports events in the United States
1961 in Detroit
Ice hockey competitions in Chicago
Ice hockey competitions in Detroit
1960s in Chicago
Stanley Cup